The Tallahatchie County Second District Courthouse is located in Sumner, Mississippi, in Tallahatchie County, Mississippi. The county courthouse was listed on the National Register of Historic Places on March 6, 2007. It is located at 108 Main Street. The two-story brick courthouse building was constructed in 1910 in a Richardsonian Romanesque architecture style with a four-story tower on one corner. It was the site of the Emmett Till murder trial. It has been restored to its appearance at the time of the trial, "to house a museum dedicated to the memory of the events surrounding Emmett Till's murder and trial. The project was expanded to focus on all the sites associated with the events. A driving tour has been developed and marked." As of 2018 there is no museum in the Courthouse.

The building's coordinates are: 33°58′13″N 90°22′10″W / 33.970278°N 90.369444°W / 33.970278; -90.369444

See also
National Register of Historic Places listings in Mississippi

References

Courthouses on the National Register of Historic Places in Mississippi
Romanesque Revival architecture in Mississippi
Government buildings completed in 1908
County courthouses in Mississippi
National Register of Historic Places in Tallahatchie County, Mississippi
1908 establishments in Mississippi
Tourist attractions in Tallahatchie County, Mississippi